Yukhta-3 is a rural locality (a settlement) in Dmitriyevsky Selsoviet of Svobodnensky District, Amur Oblast, Russia. The population was 97 as of 2018. There are 4 streets.

Geography 
Yukhta-3 is located on the left bank of the Bolshaya Pyora River, 14 km north of Svobodny (the district's administrative centre) by road. Reneyssans is the nearest rural locality.

References 

Rural localities in Svobodnensky District